Shorefront Park and the Patchogue Village Band Shell are located on Smith Street at the south end of Rider Avenue, Patchogue, New York.

Since 2007, the Park has undergone updates by the village of Patchogue. There has been replacement of the older Band shell to a more contemporary style has been replaces. The new venue served as the geographical host for the Great South Bay music festival in 2010. 

 

'Rider Avenue Park' is located directly opposite or north of Shorefront Park. This park has 3 baseball diamonds, basketball courts, hiking trails, bleacher stands, and serves local sports activities.  
The park is surrounded by tall beach grass with a natural lake.

Climate at nearby Islip, New York

See also 
 Patchogue Bay
 Great South Bay
 Mascot Dock

References

External links 
http://www.patchogue.com/parks_rec.htm
http://www.geospot.com/gs/Info?xsi=/gsdata/biz/11/06/b4287106/b4287106.xsent
http://www.exploreli.com/entertainment/localguide/48208,0,7922955.venue

Parks in Suffolk County, New York
Patchogue, New York